Qin Zhong or Zhong of Qin (died 822 BC) was the fourth ruler of the state of Qin (r. 844 to 822 BC) during China's Zhou dynasty. Qin at the time was a small fief that had been granted to his great-grandfather Feizi for his work breeding horses for King Xiao of Zhou. Qin Zhong succeeded his father Gongbo, who died in 845 BC. Their ancestral name was Ying.

In 842 BC, the people of Zhou revolted against King Li of Zhou, overthrowing him the following year, and the country fell into turmoil.  The Xirong tribes that lived near Qin also rebelled, exterminating the senior branch of the House of Ying at Quanqiu (present-day Lixian in Gansu). After King Xuan ascended the Zhou throne in 827 BC, he made Qin Zhong commander of his forces in the campaign against Xirong.

Qin Zhong reigned for 22 years until 822 BC, when he was killed in battle against the Rong. He was succeeded by Duke Zhuang (a posthumous title), the eldest of five sons. King Xuan gave Qin Zhong's sons seven thousand soldiers and they defeated the Rong and recovered their patrimony. King Xuan then awarded Qin the territory of Quanqiu, formerly held by the other branch of his family, and Duke Zhuang moved his capital from Qin to Quanqiu.

References

Year of birth unknown
Rulers of Qin
9th-century BC Chinese monarchs
822 BC deaths